The 2019 Big South women's basketball tournament was the postseason women's basketball tournament that ended the 2018–19 season of the Big South Conference. It was held March 12 through March 17, 2019, at various campus sites. Radford won the conference tournament championship game over the Campbell Lady Camels, 57–45, to receive the conference's automatic bid to the NCAA tournament.

Sites 
The first round will be played at campus sites at the home of the higher seed. The quarterfinals and semifinals will be played at #1 and #2 seeds. The championship game will be held at the home arena of the higher surviving seed.

Seeds
All 11 conference teams are eligible for the tournament. The top five teams will receive a first-round bye. Teams are seeded by record within the conference, with a tiebreaker system to seed teams with identical conference records.

Schedule

Bracket

See also
 2019 Big South Conference men's basketball tournament

References

Big South
Big South Conference women's basketball tournament